Rustam Urmanovich Akhmedov (born 10 November 1943) is an Uzbek military officer who has served as first person to hold the post of Minister of Defence of Uzbekistan from September 6, 1991 to September 29, 1997.

Biography 
Akhmetov was born in the Bag‘dod District of the Uzbek Soviet Socialist Republic on November 10, 1943. By the time he was a young adult, he was studying at the Kokand Technical School of Mechanization with a major in electrification and agriculture. After graduation, he worked as a mechanic for the Akhunbabaevsky regional association "Uzselkhoztekhnika" for about a year. He began his military service by studying as a cadet at the Tashkent Higher Tank Command School from 1962–1965. From 1965–1969, he served in the Baltic Military District (which comprises the Baltic republics of Estonia, Latvia, and Lithuania) where he was a commander of a tank platoon while concurrently acting as secretary of the Komsomol committee of an artillery regiment (beginning in 1966). In 1969, he was transferred to the Northern Group of Forces in the Polish People's Republic, where he did administrative political work for the local Komsomol.

In 1972, he was sent to the Samarkand Higher Tank Command School, which was transformed in 1974 into an automobile school. For the rest of the decade, Akhmetov served in various regiments in Soviet Uzbekistan and the Turkestan Military District. In 1985, he graduated from the Malinovsky Military Armored Forces Academy. In December 1986, he was appointed Chief of Staff the Civil Defense of the Tashkent Region. That same year, Akhmetov was elected a member of the Tashkent regional council.

On September 10, 1991, by the decree of newly elected President Islam Karimov, Akhmetov was appointed Minister of Defense of the Republic of Uzbekistan. The post of defence minister, which had been established only 4 days prior to his appointment, had never been filled before, making him the first to hold such a position. His role became effective as of July 3, 1992, when development of the ministry concluded. According to V. Ponomarev, a close associate of Colonel Akhmetov, the appointment came as a "complete surprise" due to his belief that the country has "generals who are no less worthy to take this position". The appointment of Akhmedov also caused skepticism from Russian-speaking officers of the Uzbek army due to his lack of authority among his subordinates.

In January 1992, on the basis of units of the Ministry of Internal Affairs of the Republic, he ordered that the Uzbekistan National Guard be formed, which would be subordinated directly to his office as Minister of Defense. On September 29, 1997, he was removed from his post in the Defense Ministry to serve as Minister of Emergency Situations, a position he would serve in before retiring in 2000.

Personal life
He is married and has four children (three daughters and a son). His wife works wife works as a doctor. In 2015, it was reported that Akhmedov was placed in an intensive care unit. On his 75th birthday in 2018, he was awarded the Dustlik Order by President Shavkat Mirziyoyev and was honored at a ceremony held at the State Museum of the Armed Forces hosted by Abdusalom Azizov. The ceremony was also attended by his former colleagues from the CIS countries.

References

1943 births
Living people
Uzbekistani military personnel
Defence Ministers of Uzbekistan